Jeremy Hillary Boob, Ph.D. is a fictional character appearing in the 1968 animated film Yellow Submarine, voiced by comedian Dick Emery. The character was conceived as a parody of public intellectuals and polymaths such as Southern Methodist University professor Jeremy duQuesnay Adams and theatrical director and physician Jonathan Miller. Inspiration for overall appearance and voice was also taken from Maharishi Mahesh Yogi.

Fictional character biography
In the film Yellow Submarine, the Beatles, on their way to save the fictitious region of Pepperland from the Blue Meanies, encounter Jeremy, a strange little brown-furred being with a blue face, pink ears and a fluffy, rabbit-like tail.  He has an extremely eccentric and flamboyant personality. He lives in the Sea of Nothing, also known as Nowhere Land, and speaks mostly in rhyme. He describes himself as an "eminent physicist, polyglot classicist, prize-winning botanist, hard-biting satirist, talented pianist, good dentist too.” Jeremy also owns a mysterious purple and green object that can turn from a typewriter to a tree, to an easel, a piano, and numerous other things. He spends the vast majority of his time frenetically creating art, using the various transformations of the object. He is seen carving stone, editing a nearly finished book, composing piano music, and painting in rapid succession. He also reviews his own works but states "it's (his own) policy to never read them".

The band realizes that one of their songs sums Jeremy up well and they sing "Nowhere Man" about him as he cavorts with their magic. However, he soon becomes sad when he realizes they are going to leave. Feeling sorry for him, Ringo Starr offers to take him with them and he gratefully accepts.

Later, the Submarine breaks down, and Jeremy helps fix one of the propellers. This makes the Submarine almost too efficient, and it speeds off without them. Jeremy is later kidnapped by the Blue Meanies in the Sea of Holes, and is eventually found in Pepperland, hanging by the leg to the branch of a tree.  When Ringo cuts him down, he then helps The Beatles to defeat the Meanies by covering the Chief Blue Meanie with flowers, thereby proving that a Nobody can in fact, be somebody.  

Jeremy Hillary Boob also appears in the music video for "Glass Onion", released for the 50th anniversary of the album The Beatles (commonly known as "the White Album").

Creation
Jeremy Hillary Boob was originally named Jeremy Y. du Q. Adams, after Southern Methodist University professor Jeremy duQuesnay Adams. The character of Jeremy was intended as a parody of public intellectuals and polymaths, most notably theatrical director and physician Jonathan Miller, with whom story writer Lee Minoff had previously worked. He is also alleged to have been inspired by Cambridge poet J.H. Prynne.

References

External links

Film characters introduced in 1968
Fictional poets
Fictional dentists
Fictional mammals
The Beatles' Yellow Submarine